Lukas Resetarits (born 14 October 1947, in Stinatz) is an Austrian cabaret artist and actor, best known for playing police inspector Kottan in the Austrian TV series Kottan ermittelt.

Resetarits was born in the Austrian state Burgenland, but his family moved to Vienna when he was at the age of four. Resetarits attended Austrian gymnasium which he finished in 1965. He studied psychology and philosophy at the University of Vienna, at the same time jobbing as rock singer, construction worker and traffic officer at the Vienna International Airport.

In 1975 he joined the cabaret group "KEIF", which consisted of Wolfgang Teuschl, Erwin Steinhauer, Alfred Rubatschek and Erich Demmer. In 1977 together with Teuschl and Steinhauer he performed the TV cabaret "Tu felix Austria".

On 26 October 1977 he premiered his first solo program "Rechts Mitte Links" in the Konzerthauskeller. In May 1978 he presented his second solo program "A Krise muaß her", and performed a second TV cabaret with Teuschl and Steinhauer, "Man wird ja noch fragen dürfen". He released his first LP vinyl record "Ein Abend mit Lukas Resetarits" ("An Evening with Lukas Resetarits") in 1979.

From 1980 to 1983 he was main actor in the Austrian TV series Kottan ermittelt, written by Helmut Zenker and directed by Peter Patzak.

Resetarits has been married since 1968 and has two daughters. Willi Resetarits (musician known as Dr. Kurt Ostbahn) and Peter Resetarits (TV host at ORF) are brothers. Karin Resetarits, a present member of the European Parliament, is his divorced sister in law.

Cabaret programs 
 1977 Rechts Mitte Links
 1978 A Krise muaß her
 1979 Haben schon gewählt
 1979 Alles leiwand
 1981 Nur kane Wellen
 1982 Ka Zukunft
 1983 Vorläufig ohne Titel
 1984 Was nun
 1985 I oder I
 1986 Das 10. Programm
 1987 Rekapituliere
 1988 Nichts geht mehr
 1989 Zu blöd
 1990 Ich bin so frei
 1991 Heimspiel - live
 1992 Zu bunt
 1995 Alles zurück
 1997 Kein Grund zum Feiern
 1999 Ich tanze nicht
 2001 Niemandsland
 2002 Zeit
 2003 Nachspielzeit
 2006 XXII
 2009 "Osterreich - ein Warietee"

Awards 
 Nestroy-Ring 1981
 Österreichischer Kleinkunstpreis 1981, 1983, 1984
 Deutscher Kleinkunstpreis 1985
 "Ybbser Spaßvogel"
 Romy 1997, best actor
 German Cabaret Prize 1998
 Karl 2004
 Goldenes Ehrenzeichen für Verdienste um die Republik Österreich 2012

External links 

 
 

1947 births
Living people
Austrian male film actors
Kabarettists
People from Güssing District
Austrian male television actors
20th-century Austrian male actors
21st-century Austrian male actors
Austrian people of Croatian descent
Recipients of the Decoration of Honour for Services to the Republic of Austria